Age determination in dinosaurs is mainly used to determine the approximate age of a dinosaur when the animal died.

History
Early attempts to estimate the longevity of dinosaurs used allometric scaling principles. Ages were determined by dividing individual mass estimates by rates of growth for similar, extant taxa. For very large individuals, growth rates were extrapolated to dinosaur proportions using regression analysis. The results of these investigations have been extremely variable as they depend on mass estimates and growth rates that are highly at odds with one another.

For example, longevity estimates for the sauropod Hypselosaurus priscus range from a few decades to several hundred years. However, it has been shown that most dinosaur bones have growth lines that are visible in thin sectioned material viewed under a polarized light source.

Growth lines
Two types of growth lines exist: annuli, and lines of arrested growth (LAGs). Histological examinations have revealed that annuli are composed of thin layers of avascular bone with parallel-aligned bone fibers. The growth line annuli are found compressed between broad vascularized regions of bone with randomly oriented fibrillar patterns, known as zones.

Lines of arrested growth, similar to annuli, are found between zones are avascular. They are, however, much thinner, and have relatively fewer bone fibers by volume.

Studies on extant vertebrates indicate that the vascularized zones form during moderate to rapid skeletogenesis, and that abrupt metabolic disruptions of bone formation can trigger growth line deposition.

Both types of growth lines may be deposited in synchrony with endogenous biorhythms. For example, captive crocodilians exposed to constant temperature, diet, and photoperiod, still exhibit the periodic and cyclical skeletal growth banding of their wild counterparts. Consequently, it is assumed by many paleontologists that the growth lines of dinosaurs reflect annual rhythms, and that they may be used to determine individual ages. However, in the large and long bones of many dinosaurian taxa, resorption of internal and external bone proceeds even as new cortical bone continues to be deposited, so that growth lines deposited early in development may need to be inferred.

Results in dinosaurs
The results of pioneering efforts to age dinosaur fossils using growth ring counts suggest that the longevity of the  basal ceratopsian Psittacosaurus mongoliensis was 10 or 11 years. The prosauropod Massospondylus carinatus 15 years of age, the sauropods Lapparentosaurus and Narindasaurus 43 years, the coelophysoid Megapnosaurus rhodesiensis 7 years, and the maniraptor Troodon formosus 3-5 years of age respectively. These data are being used in conjunction with mass estimated in order to infer the metabolic status and growth rates of dinosaurs.

References

Dinosaur paleobiology
Senescence in non-human organisms